The following is a history of the basketball players and head coaches that have competed for the Greece men's national basketball team, at all of the major international basketball tournaments.

Summer Olympics, World Cup and EuroBasket

FIBA Olympic Qualifying Tournament

1960 FIBA World Olympic Qualifying Tournament: finished 10th of 18 teams (Did not qualify for 1960 Summer Olympics)

Kostas Mourouzis, Ioannis Spanoudakis, Ioannis Tsikas, Panos Koukopoulos, Alekos Kontovounisios, Nikos Poulakidas, Thanasis Stalios, Georgios Amerikanos, Georgios Oikonomou, Asterios Goussios, Antonis Christeas, Petros Petrakis (Head Coach: Feidon Mattaiou)

1964 FIBA European Olympic Qualifying Tournament: finished 8th of 17 teams (Did not qualify for 1964 Summer Olympics)

Thanasis Peppas, Georgios Kolokithas, Antonis Christeas, Eas Larentzakis, Petros Panagiotarakos, Kostas Politis, Georgios Amerikanos, Alekos Kontovounisios, Stergios Bousvaros, Georgios Trontzos, Stelios Vasileiadis, Georgios Oikonomou (Head Coach: Feidon Mattaiou)

1968 FIBA European Olympic Qualifying Tournament: finished 9th of 12 teams (Did not qualify for 1968 Summer Olympics)

Lakis Tsavas, Georgios Barlas, Georgios Trontzos, Georgios Kolokithas, Nikos Sismanidis, Eas Larentzakis, Kostas Diamantopoulos, Kostas Parisis, Petros Panagiotarakos, Andreas Chaikalis, Makis Katsafados, Vassilis Goumas (Head Coach: Feidon Mattaiou)

1972 FIBA World Olympic Qualifying Tournament: finished 10th of 12 teams (Did not qualify for 1972 Summer Olympics)

Apostolos Kontos, Vassilis Goumas, Vassilis Nidriotis, Michalis Giannouzakos, Aris Raftopoulos, Nikos Nesiadis, Takis Koroneos, Thanasis Christoforou, Nikos Sismanidis, Vangelis Alexandris, Christos Iordanidis, Makis Katsafados (Head Coach: Dick Dukeshire)

1980 FIBA European Olympic Qualifying Tournament: finished 9th of 19 teams (Did not qualify for 1980 Summer Olympics)

Kyriakos Vidas, Vassilis Paramanidis, Panagiotis Giannakis, Kostas Petropoulos, Manthos Katsoulis, Sotiris Sakellariou, Nikos Galis, Astirios Zois, Charis Papageorgiou, Takis Karatzoulidis, Dimitris Kokolakis (Head Coach: Dick Dukeshire)

1984 FIBA European Olympic Qualifying Tournament: finished 5th of 8 teams (Did not qualify for 1984 Summer Olympics)

Nikos Galis, Argiris Papapetrou, Panagiotis Giannakis, Manthos Katsoulis, Michalis Romanidis, Kyriakos Vidas, Kostas Missas, Nikos Filippou, Liveris Andritsos, Panagiotis Fasoulas, Takis Karatzoulidis, Nikos Stavropoulos (Head Coach: Kostas Politis)

1988 FIBA European Olympic Qualifying Tournament: finished 5th of 8 teams (Did not qualify for 1988 Summer Olympics)

Nikos Galis, Efthimis Bakatsias, Panagiotis Giannakis, Argiris Kambouris, David Stergakos, Georgios Makaras, Dimitris Papadopoulos, Nikos Filippou, Liveris Andritsos, Panagiotis Fasoulas, Memos Ioannou, Fanis Christodoulou (Head Coach: Kostas Politis)

1992 FIBA European Olympic Qualifying Tournament: finished 11th of 25 teams (Did not qualify for 1992 Summer Olympics)

Angelos Koronios, Kostas Patavoukas, Panagiotis Giannakis, Christos Tsekos, Nikos Boudouris, Ioannis Milonas, Nasos Galakteros, Dimitris Papadopoulos, Dinos Angelidis, Panagiotis Fasoulas, Georgios Papadakos, Fanis Christodoulou (Head Coach: Efthimis Kioumourtzoglou)

2008 FIBA World Olympic Qualifying Tournament: finished  1st  of 12 teams (Qualified for 2008 Summer Olympics)

Thodoris Papaloukas, Ioannis Bourousis, Nikos Zisis, Vassilis Spanoulis, Panagiotis Vasilopoulos, Antonis Fotsis, Georgios Printezis, Andreas Glyniadakis, Kostas Tsartsaris, Dimitris Diamantidis, Sofoklis Schortsanitis, Michalis Pelekanos (Head Coach: Panagiotis Giannakis)

2012 FIBA World Olympic Qualifying Tournament: finished 5th of 12 teams (Did not qualify for 2012 Summer Olympics)

Vassilis Spanoulis, Ioannis Bourousis, Georgios Printezis, Kostas Papanikolaou, Nick Calathes, Nikos Zisis, Michael Bramos, Kostas Vasileiadis, Vangelis Mantzaris, Kostas Kaimakoglou, Antonis Fotsis, Dimitrios Mavroeidis (Head Coach: Ilias Zouros)

2016 Turin FIBA World Olympic Qualifying Tournament: finished 3rd of 6 teams (Did not qualify for 2016 Summer Olympics)

Ioannis Athinaiou, Nick Calathes, Ioannis Bourousis, Vangelis Mantzaris, Dimitris Agravanis, Ioannis Papapetrou, Vassilis Charalampopoulos, Georgios Bogris, Stratos Perperoglou, Giannis Antetokounmpo, Kosta Koufos, Thanasis Antetokounmpo (Head Coach: Fotis Katsikaris)

2020 Victoria FIBA World Olympic Qualifying Tournament: finished 2nd of 6 teams (Did not qualify for 2020 Summer Olympics)

Nikos Rogkavopoulos, Linos Chrysikopoulos, Dimitris Katsivelis, Giannoulis Larentzakis, Vassilis Kavvadas, Nick Calathes, Kostas Sloukas, Georgios Papagiannis, Charis Giannopoulos, Kostas Antetokounmpo, Leonidas Kaselakis, Dinos Mitoglou (Head Coach: Rick Pitino)

Mediterranean Games

1951 Mediterranean Games: finished 4th

Themis Cholevas, Panos Manias, Takis Christoforou, Stelios Arvanitis, Nikos Milas, Mimis Stefanidis,
Faidon Matthaiou, Dinos Papadimas, Takis Taliadoros, Ioannis Spanoudakis, Alekos Karalis (Head Coach: Vladimiros Vallas)

1955 Mediterranean Games: finished 3rd 

Mimis Stefanidis, Alekos Spanoudakis, Kostas Karamanlis, Panos Manias, Dinos Papadimas, Vassilis Eftaxias, Faidon Matthaiou, Themis Cholevas, Aristeidis Roubanis, Ioannis Spanoudakis, Kostas Mourouzis (Head Coach: Nikos Nissiotis)

1967 Mediterranean Games: finished 4th

Kostas Diamantopoulos, Stratos Bazios, Lakis Tsavas, Andreas Chaikalis, Takis Maglos, Georgios Trontzos, Georgios Amerikanos, Christos Zoupas, Kostas Politis, Eas Larentzakis, Georgios Kolokithas, Georgios Barlas (Head Coach: Missas Pantazopoulos)

1971 Mediterranean Games: finished 3rd 

Kostas Diamantopoulos, Ioannis Politis, Christos Ioardanidis, Thanasis Christoforou, Georgios Barlas, Aris Raftopoulos, Michalis Giannouzakos, Makis Katsafados, Apostolos Kontos, Pavlos Stamelos, Georgios Trontzos, Kostas Bogatsiotis (Head Coach: Themis Cholevas)

1975 Mediterranean Games: finished 5th

Charis Papazoglou, Kostas Petropoulos, Pavlos Stamelos, Pavlos Diakoulas, Dimitris Fosses, Vangelis Alexandris, Steve Giatzoglou, Charis Papageorgiou, Georgios Kastrinakis, Dimitris Kokolakis, Michalis Giannouzakos, Takis Koroneos (Head Coach: Dick Dukeshire)

1979 Mediterranean Games: finished 1st 

Kostas Petropoulos, Georgios Kastrinakis, Vassilis Paramandis, Takis Karatzoulidis, Manthos Katsoulis, Sotiris Sakellariou, Takis Koroneos, Minas Gekos, Liveris Andritsos, Panagiotis Giannakis, Dimitris Kokolakis,  (Head Coach: Dick Dukeshire)

1983 Mediterranean Games: finished 4th

Dimitris Dimakopoulos, Fanis Christodoulou, Dimitrios Kokolakis, Nikos Stavropoulos, Michalis Romanidis, Minas Gekos, Kostas Petropoulos, Liveris Andritsos, Albert Mallach, Panagiotis Giannakis, Nikos Filippou, Panagiotis Fasoulas, (Head Coach: Kostas Politis)

Greece men's national under-26 basketball team

1987 Mediterranean Games: finished 3rd 

Christos Kountourakis, Konstantinos Alexandridis, Ioannis Papagiannis, Stavros Elliniadis, Konstantinos Kalampakos, Alexis Giannopoulos, Argiris Kambouris, Kostas Patavoukas, Nikolaos Tzigopoulos, Dimitrios Sotiriou, Angelos Papadimitriou (Head Coach: Efthimis Kioumourtzoglou)

1991 Mediterranean Games: finished 2nd 

Nikos Oikonomou, Konstantinos Gagaoudakis, Christos Myriounis, Konstantinos Tampakis, Konstantinos Moraitis, Dinos Angelidis, Evangelos Logothetis, Ioannis Papagiannis, Ioannis Milonas, Aristeidis Cholopoulos, Angelos Koronios, Nikos Boudouris (Head Coach: Georgios Poestos)

1993 Mediterranean Games: finished 4th

Evangelos Logothetis, Konstantinos Tampakis, Michalis Pournaras, Fotios Gousgouris, Tzanis Stavrakopoulos, Theodoros Asteriadis, Dimitrios Avdalas, Achilleas Mamatziolas, Georgios Balogiannis, Aristeidis Cholopoulos, Georgios Limniatis, Nikos Boudouris (Head Coach: Georgios Tsitskaris)

1997 Mediterranean Games: finished 4th

Nikos Vetoulas, Michalis Yfantis, Apostolos Dakos, Georgios Limniatis, Georgios Pavlidis, Konstantinos Nikakis, Georgios Chrysanthopoulos, Vassilis Soulis, Georgios Giannouzakos, Vassilis Kikilias, Ioannis Sioutis, Ilias Tsopis (Head Coach: Georgios Tsitskaris)

2001 Mediterranean Games: finished 2nd 

Pantelis Papaioakeim, Artemios Kouvaris, Dimitris Marmarinos, Dimitrios Misiakos, Vassilis Spanoulis, Georgios Pavlidis, Alexis Falekas, Nikos Zisis, Christos Tapoutos, Antonis Asimakopoulos, Dimitris Diamantidis, Periklis Dorkofikis (Head Coach: Nikos Stavropoulos)

2005 Mediterranean Games: finished 2nd 

Savvas Iliadis, Tasos Charismidis, Georgios Dedas, Fanis Koumpouras, Angelos Siamandouras, Christos Tapoutos, Georgios Tsiakos, Dimitrios Charitopoulos, Nikos Barlos, Nikos Papanikolopoulos, Ioannis Georgallis, Panagiotis Kafkis (Head Coach: Thanasis Papadimitriou)

2009 Mediterranean Games: finished 2nd 

Dimitrios Kalaitzidis, Dimitrios Karadolamis, Fanis Koumpouras, Alexis Kyritsis, Dimitrios Lolas, Dimitrios Mavroeidis, Igor Milošević, Petros Noeas, Nikos Papanikolaou, Gaios Skordilis, Stavros Toutziarakis, Ian Vougioukas (Head Coach: Ioannis Giannapoulos)

See also
 FIBA World Cup
 Basketball at the Summer Olympics
 FIBA World OQT
 FIBA EuroBasket
 Basketball at the Mediterranean Games
 Balkan Basketball Championship

References

External links
 Hellenic Basketball Federation 
 Greece at the FIBA Europe official website
 Greece on FIBA.com